"Whistle" is a song recorded by South Korean girl group Blackpink. It was released through YG Entertainment on August 8, 2016, simultaneously with "Boombayah"; both tracks are on the group's debut single album titled Square One (2016). An acoustic version of the song was also included in the group's second single album Square Two (2016). "Whistle" was written and produced by YG Entertainment collaborators Teddy Park, Bekuh Boom, and Future Bounce, with additional lyrics penned by labelmate B.I of iKon. Musically, the song consists of a minimal drum and bass beat over a "booming", "exotic" hip-hop melody and integrates a variety of instrumentations, including heartbeats and whistles—directly alluding to the title of the track.

"Whistle" received generally positive reviews from music critics following its release, who praised the song's musical styles and composition, and was further named among the best releases of the year by Billboard magazine. A commercial success in the group's home country, "Whistle" claimed the number-one position on the Gaon Digital Chart for two weeks, marking their first number-one single of their career. Directed by Beomjin J of VM Project Architecture, the song's accompanying music video was an instant hit on YouTube, achieving over ten million views within five days of its release and was awarded the Best Music Video of the year at the 2016 Mnet Asian Music Awards. Blackpink made their debut stage with "Whistle" on SBS's Inkigayo on August 14, 2016, and continued to promote the song on the music program throughout August and September.

Background and composition
On June 29, 2016, YG Entertainment officially confirmed that Blackpink would soon debut as a four-member girl group, marking the agency's first girl group in seven years, since the debut of 2NE1. On July 6, the group uploaded their first dance practice video to their official YouTube channel, which attracted attention among the public in regards to the group's potential style and concept. On July 29, YG announced that Blackpink's debut would take place on August 8. On August 6, the tracks "Whistle", along with "Boombayah", were revealed to be the two title tracks for their debut single album Square One. Both of the singles were released as planned in conjunction with the single album on August 8, 2016. The song was written by B.I, Teddy Park and Bekuh Boom, with production being handled by the latter two and Future Bounce. A Japanese version of the song was included as part of the group's first eponymous Japanese EP, which was released on August 29, 2017, by YGEX.

Composed in the key signature of B major, the track contains a tempo of 103 beats per minute and has a runtime of 3:31. Stylistically, "Whistle" has been described as a hip-hop number with a dreamy rhythm and a mature feel, integrating whistle hooks over a minimal drum 'n' bass melody. Beginning with the gentle whisper, "Hey boy," the song transitions into a hip-hop beat which integrates instrumentations of snaps accompanied with the predominant whistling melody. Just prior to the chorus, the melody shifts into an increase of percussion and guitar, as well as clapping instrumentations. The chorus then employs the same hook from the beginning of the track with the exchange between the primary whistle sounds and snaps. Following the secondary chorus, the track transitions into the bridge where it is followed by a remix of the chorus. Lyrically, the song revolves around the themes of affection and romance. The instrumentations of whistling alludes to the sounds of the racing heart as well as the member's wanting their love interests to call out to her.

Critical reception 
Upon its release, "Whistle" garnered generally positive reviews from music critics. Billboard K-Town's Jeff Benjamin opines that Blackpink "[embraces] the hip-hop sensibilities and club-ready sounds with which their seniors gained an international following", referring to their labelmates Psy, Big Bang, and 2NE1. He further stated that the song, "brings together impassioned crooning and their youthful hip-hop delivery with minimal drum 'n' bass and an undeniable whistle hook". Rolling Stones Brittany Spanos placed Blackpink in her list of "10 New Artists You Need to Know: September 2016", saying: "[a]ll low-end boom and high-end tweets, the infectious "Whistle" feels like perfect pop update of the similarly chirpy Ying Yang Twins classic "Whistle While You Twurk." Entertainment Weeklys Joey Nolfi said that the song "quickly turns up the heat, layering irresistible finger snaps, a saccharine bridge, electric guitar riffs, mammoth bass, and, of course, cow bell-accompanied whistles ... it wouldn't sound entirely out of place occupying a lofty position on American charts." In a review of the group's discography in May 2019, Rhian Daly of NME asserted that despite the quieter nature of the track, in contrast to most of the group's songs, "it gives the band chance to command things with just their voices – something they do with ease". Following the release of the group's first Korean-language studio album in October 2020, Palmer Haasch of Insider ranked "Whistle" as their third best single overall, stating that: "From Jisoo's opening "Hey boy," it's cool and confident, stitched together with a whistle hook and minimalist production elements that allow the members' vocals to shine through."

Accolades

Commercial performance 
Commercially, "Whistle" experienced success in South Korea. The song opened at number-one on the Gaon Digital Chart issue dated August 7–13, 2016, making it the group's first number-one entry on the chart. It sold 150,750 digital units and garnered 4.3 million streams, ranking at number one and number two on the component download and streaming charts, respectively. The following week, the song maintained its position as the number-one single of the week, selling an additional 124,500 digital units and received 5 million streams, and placed atop the streaming chart for the first time. By the end of the month, the song became the best-selling and most-streamed single of August, having sold 413,000 digital units in addition to receiving 17,000,000 streams. On the year-end Gaon Digital Chart, "Whistle" was named the 36th best-selling song of the year, accumulating a total of 991,628 in digital sales. Factoring together digital sales, streaming, and background music sales, the song was ranked as the 32nd best-performing song of 2016. According to the Korea Music Content Association (KMCA), "Whistle" surpassed 2,500,000 digital sales in 2019 and 100,000,000 streams in 2021. In the United States, "Whistle" entered at number 2 on the Billboard World Digital Songs chart. Both songs on Square One single moved an estimated 6,000 digital units each, with "Boombayah" selling slightly more. In its second week on the chart, "Whistle" placed at number 3.

Music video and promotion
The music video for "Whistle" was directed by Beomjin J of VM Project Architecture, and was released through Blackpink's official YouTube channel on August 8, 2016. It surpassed nearly ten million views within five days. A choreography practice video for "Whistle" was released on August 18, 2016. On June 20, 2020, the video surpassed 500 million views. On December 30, 2020, the music video surpassed 600 million views. The music video was awarded Best Music Video of the year at the 2016 Mnet Asian Music Awards. As of January 2023, the video has surpassed over 800 million views.

Blackpink began appearing on South Korea's televised music programs with the August 14, 2016 broadcast of Inkigayo, where they received their first trophy for "Whistle" a week later, becoming the fastest girl group to achieve this feat.

Credits and personnel
Credits adapted from Melon and Korea Music Copyright Association (KOMCA).
 Blackpink primary vocals
 Teddy Park composer, lyricist, arranger
 Bekuh Boom composer, lyricist
 Future Bounce composer, arranger
 B.I lyricist

Charts

Weekly charts

Monthly charts

Year-end charts

Release history

References 

Blackpink songs
2016 singles
YG Entertainment singles
Gaon Digital Chart number-one singles